2 Chronicles 17 is the seventeenth chapter of the Second Book of Chronicles the Old Testament in the Christian Bible or of the second part of the Books of Chronicles in the Hebrew Bible. The book is compiled from older sources by an unknown person or group, designated by modern scholars as "the Chronicler", and had the final shape established in late fifth or fourth century BCE. This chapter belongs to the section focusing on the kingdom of Judah until its destruction by the Babylonians under Nebuchadnezzar and the beginning of restoration under Cyrus the Great of Persia  (2 Chronicles 10 to 36). The focus of this chapter (and the next ones until chapter 20) is the reign of Jehoshaphat, king of Judah.

Text
This chapter was originally written in the Hebrew language and is divided into 19 verses.

Textual witnesses
Some early manuscripts containing the text of this chapter in Hebrew are of the Masoretic Text tradition, which includes the Aleppo Codex (10th century), and Codex Leningradensis (1008).

There is also a translation into Koine Greek known as the Septuagint, made in the last few centuries BCE. Extant ancient manuscripts of the Septuagint version include Codex Vaticanus (B; B; 4th century), and Codex Alexandrinus (A; A; 5th century).

Old Testament references
: 
: 
: ; 
: 
: 
: ; 
: ; ; ; ; ; ; ;  ; ; 
:

Analysis
This chapter divides into three parts: two general judgements on Jehoshaphat's rule (17:1–6, 10–19) and one report on teaching the law to the people (17:7–9).  The first judgement (verses 1–6) focuses on domestic politics and religion, wheres the second (verses 10–19) concerns with foreign and military policy. Both 1 Kings and 2 Chronicles commend his reign (1 Kings 22:43–44; 2 Chronicles 16:3–4; 20:32–33), but the Chronicles provide more information not recorded in 1 Kings.

Jehoshaphat, king of Judah (17:1–6)
Jehoshaphat's reign was marked with peace, especially there were no conflicts with the northern kingdom (verse 1), drawing parallel with Solomon. Despite his successes as ruler—honored and wealthy (verse 5)—Jehoshaphat remained humble and God-fearing.

Jehoshaphat’s educational plan (17:7–9)
The education of all people of Judah on the book of the law of the Lord (Deuteronomy 17:18–20; 2 Kings 22:8–13) was performed by the royal officers, Levites, and priests (in that particular order), reflecting the growing importance of the Torah teaching and the Levites as teachers in postexilic era (Ezra 7:25; Nehemiah 8).

Verse 7
Also in the third year of his reign he sent to his princes, even to Benhail, and to Obadiah, and to Zechariah, and to Nethaneel, and to Michaiah, to teach in the cities of Judah.
Cross references: ; 
“The third year": in Thiele's chronology is between September 867 and 866 BCE. Jehoshaphat became coregent, while his father Asa became sick, in September 873 BCE and ruled alone as king between September 870 and April 869 BCE.
"Benhail" means "son of power"

Jehoshaphat’s military power (17:10–19)
This section contains a second summarizing description of Jehoshaphat's reign from the perspective of foreign and military policy, with all Judah and the lands around Judah were struck by fear of the Lord (verse 10) and paid tributes to the king (verse 11; cf. 2 Chronicles 27:5). The army's composition (verses 14–19) were closely linked with the construction of forts, differentiating between army divisions from Judah and Benjamin (less than Judah and equipped with light armour consisting of bows and shields).

See also

Related Bible parts: Deuteronomy 17, 2 Chronicles 14, 2 Chronicles 15, 2 Chronicles 21, Isaiah 7, Isaiah 10, Isaiah 31, Jeremiah 20, Zechariah 4

Notes

References

Sources

 
 Thiele, Edwin R., The Mysterious Numbers of the Hebrew Kings, (1st ed.; New York: Macmillan, 1951; 2d ed.; Grand Rapids: Eerdmans, 1965; 3rd ed.; Grand Rapids: Zondervan/Kregel, 1983).

External links
 Jewish translations:
 Divrei Hayamim II - II Chronicles - Chapter 17 (Judaica Press) in Hebrew and English translation [with Rashi's commentary] at Chabad.org
 Christian translations:
 Online Bible at GospelHall.org (ESV, KJV, Darby, American Standard Version, Bible in Basic English)
 2 Chronicles Chapter 17. Bible Gateway

17